Statts Mills is an unincorporated community in Jackson County, West Virginia, United States. Statts Mills had a post office, which closed on July 30, 2005.

The community was named for the local Staats family.

References

Unincorporated communities in Jackson County, West Virginia
Unincorporated communities in West Virginia